No More Looking over My Shoulder is American country music artist Travis Tritt's sixth studio album, released on October 13, 1998. It was the last album to be released by Warner Bros. Records before leaving for Columbia Records in 2000. Three singles were released from this album, in order of release they were: "If I Lost You", the title track, and "Start The Car", although the latter became the first single of his career to miss Top 40 on the country charts.

Content
The album's title track was co-written by Michael Peterson, who also recorded it on his 2004 album Modern Man. Peterson contributes a backing vocal to Tritt's version.

Critical reception
Michael Gallucci of AllMusic criticized Tritt's Southern rock influences by saying that it made the album sound "conspicuously way out of time." He thought that "If I Lost You" was the most country-influenced song and strongest track.

Track listing

Personnel
As listed in liner notes.

Musicians

Eddie Bayers – drums, percussion
Richard Bennett – acoustic guitar
Bekka Bramlett – background vocals
Larry Byrom – acoustic guitar
Jude Cole – electric guitar
Thom Flora – background vocals
Paul Franklin – steel guitar
Barry Green – trombone
Rob Hajacos – fiddle
Aubrey Haynie – fiddle
Jim Horn – tenor saxophone, horn arrangements
David Hungate – bass guitar
Paul Leim – drums
Brent Mason – electric guitar
Dana McVicker – background vocals
Steve Nathan – Hammond B-3 organ, keyboards
Steve Patrick – trumpet
Michael Peterson – background vocals
Hargus "Pig" Robbins – piano
Matt Rollings – piano
Charles Rose – trombone
John Wesley Ryles – background vocals
Travis Tritt – lead vocals, background vocals
Robby Turner – steel guitar
Billy Joe Walker Jr. – acoustic guitar, electric guitar
Biff Watson – acoustic guitar
Dennis Wilson – background vocals
Glenn Worf – bass guitar
Curtis Wright – background vocals
Curtis Young – background vocals
Reggie Young – electric guitar

Production

Amy Frigo – recording assistant
Tyler Gish – overdub assistant
Steve Lowery – overdub assistant
Patrick Murphy – assistant
Benny Quinn – mastering
Alan Schulman – overdubs
Glenn Spinner – recording assistant
Chris Stone – overdubs, overdub assistant
David Thoener – recording
Travis Tritt – producer
Billy Joe Walker Jr. – producer
Matt Weeks – recording assistant

Chart performance

References

1998 albums
Travis Tritt albums
Warner Records albums
Albums produced by Billy Joe Walker Jr.